Delyth Non Jewell (born 1988) is a Welsh Plaid Cymru politician. She is a Member of the Senedd (MS) for South Wales East region.

Early life
Jewell was born in Caerphilly and grew up in Ystrad Mynach, and attended Ysgol Bro Allta and Ysgol Gyfun Cwm Rhymni. She graduated from the University of Oxford with a BA in English Language and Literature, and an MA in Celtic Studies. In 2007, she was president of the Dafydd ap Gwilym Society, the university's Welsh-language society.

Career
Jewell spent five and a half years as a researcher and speechwriter for Plaid's Members of Parliament, and took part in new laws against stalking in 2012 and domestic violence in 2015. She also worked for Citizens Advice and Welsh Water, as well as for the charity ActionAid on matters of women's rights and international development. Two days before entering the Senedd, she wrote an article for The Independent in which she highlighted the abuse and harassment of female politicians.

Senedd
Jewell was second on the party list in the South Wales East region in the 2016 Welsh election, from which only Steffan Lewis was elected. After Lewis died on 11 January 2019, Jewell succeeded him into the Senedd on 16 January 2019. She was sworn into office on 8 February 2019.

References

1988 births
Living people
Female members of the Senedd
Plaid Cymru members of the Senedd
Wales MSs 2016–2021
Wales MSs 2021–2026
People from Caerphilly
People educated at Ysgol Gyfun Cwm Rhymni
Alumni of the University of Oxford
Welsh-speaking politicians